Nikola Asenov  (born 15 February 1983, in Sofia) is a Bulgarian football defender who played for Akademik Sofia.

References

1983 births
Living people
Bulgarian footballers
PFC CSKA Sofia players
Akademik Sofia players
Association football defenders
First Professional Football League (Bulgaria) players